Michael R. Combi (born 1952), is a space science professor at the University of Michigan.  Combi's focus is planetary astronomy, and he specializes in the detailed modeling of cometary comae. His model for the distribution of water molecules and associated byproducts has been invaluable in understanding a wide variety of coma observations.  He also contributed to discoveries related to the interactions between solar winds and comet tails.

Select Publications

References

External links 
Tales of a Bright Comet: Comet Hale-Bopp (C/1995 O1) talk summary
Michael Combi Homepage

Living people
1952 births
University of Michigan faculty